The 2014 European Amateur Team Championship took place 8–12 July at Linna Golf Oy in Hämeenlinna, Finland. It was the 31st men's golf European Amateur Team Championship.

Venue 
The course, situated 5 kilometres east of Hämeenlinna, located in the historical province of Tavastia and the modern province of Kanta-Häme in the south of Finland, 98 kilometres north of Helsinki, was designed by Tim Lobb in cooperation with European Tour Design and opened in 2005.

Format 
Each team consisted of 6 players, playing two rounds of stroke-play over two days, counting the five best scores each day for each team. The eight best teams formed flight A, in knock-out match-play over the next three days. The teams were seeded based on their positions after the stroke play. The first placed team was drawn to play the quarter final against the eight placed team, the second against the seventh, the third against the sixth and the fourth against the fifth. Teams were allowed to use six players during the team matches, selecting four of them in the two morning foursome games and five players in to the afternoon single games. Teams knocked out after the quarter finals played one foursome game and four single games in each of their remaining matches. Games all square at the 18th hole were declared halved, if the team match was already decided.

The eight teams placed 9–16 in the qualification stroke-play formed flight B, to play similar knock-out play, with one foursome game and four single games in each match, to decide their final positions.

Teams 
16 nation teams contested the event. Each team consisted of six players.

Winners 
Leader of the opening 36-hole competition was team England with a 20-under-par score of 700, three strokes ahead of team Spain. Sweden, on third place, was another ten strokes behind.

There was no official award for the lowest individual score, but individual leader was Ryan Evans, England, with an 11-under-par score of 133, one stroke ahead of Hurly Long, Germany.

Team Spain won the gold medal, earning their third title, beating team Ireland in the final 4½–2½.

Team England, earned the bronze on third place, after beating neighbor nation Scotland 4½–2½ in the bronze match.

A second division, named European Amateur Championship Division 2, took place 9 – 12 July 2014 in the Czech Republic. The three best placed teams, Wales, Poland and the Czech Republic qualified for the 2015 European Amateur Team Championship.

Iceland, Portugal and Austria placed 14th, 15th and 16th in the 2014 championship and were moved to Division 2 for 2015.

Results 
Qualification round

Team standings

* Note: In the event of a tie the order was determined by thebest total of the two non-counting scores of the two rounds.

Individual leaders

Note: There was no official award for the lowest individual score.

Flight A

Bracket

Final games

* Note: Game declared halved, since team match already decided.

Flight B

Bracket

Final standings

Source:

See also 
 Eisenhower Trophy – biennial world amateur team golf championship for men organized by the International Golf Federation.
 European Ladies' Team Championship – European amateur team golf championship for women organised by the European Golf Association.

References

External links 
European Golf Association: Full results

European Amateur Team Championship
Golf tournaments in Finland
European Amateur Team Championship
European Amateur Team Championship
European Amateur Team Championship